Wurm: Journey to the Center of the Earth, released in Japan as , is a multi-genre video game developed by Cyclone System and published by Asmik and SOFEL for the Nintendo Entertainment System in 1991.

Gameplay

Wurm has a variety of different styles of play, with side-scrolling travel stages in the VZR vehicles, overhead shooting levels, levels where the protagonist Moby leaves the vehicle to explore underground ruins, and first-person shooting levels with boss monsters. Boss monsters have a probability meter that has to be raised up to 100% before that enemy can be eliminated. More characters join the crew over the course of the game. Moby must leave her vehicle in certain sections of the game to fight the enemies in a side-scrolling fashion. Her set of combat skills include a kick, jump and the use of a firearm. Players lose the game if they run out of either fuel or energy in the life bar.

Plot
The plot of this video game deals with mysterious earthquakes that emerge in the year 1999, and the government dispatches explorers in powerful digging machines called Vazorudas or VZRs (renamed WURM in the US manual, but the name is never used in the game). Moby is an 18-year-old leader of one VZR's crew. While doing some research near the core of the earth, Moby and her friends discover that two races of subterranean humans have been fighting a war underground. Contact is lost with four VZRs with the player controlling the crew of the fifth, who discovered that the previous teams were attacked by a subterranean empire of monsters called the Nonmalta. The Nonmalta are at war with a race of peaceful humanoids called the Dinamur, and the VZR crew find themselves embroiled in the war as well.

Reception

Nintendo Power gave the game a rating of 4 out of 5 in their September 1991 issue, while GamePro assigned the game a 3 out of 5 two months later.

Reviews
Questicle.net

References

External links
 
 Wurm at GameFAQs
 Wurm at Shoichi Yoshikawa's personal homepage 

1991 video games
Alternate history video games
Asmik Ace Entertainment games
Nintendo Entertainment System games
Nintendo Entertainment System-only games
Science fiction video games
Side-scrolling platform games
Single-player video games
SOFEL games
Video games developed in Japan
Video games featuring female protagonists
Video games set in 1999